Krste Crvenkovski (July 16, 1921 in Prilep – July 21, 2001 in Skopje) was a
Yugoslav Communist political leader in the Socialist Federal Republic of Yugoslavia and in the Socialist Republic of Macedonia. He was a leader of the League of Communists of Macedonia (July 1963 - March 1969).

He was a political opponent to the dominant political course of Lazar Koliševski in the 1970s.

References

1921 births
2001 deaths
People from Prilep
League of Communists of Macedonia politicians
Yugoslav Partisans members
Recipients of the Order of the People's Hero